Adrienne Pickering (born 22 February 1981) is an Australian actress.

Early life and education
Born in rural Queensland, Pickering was educated at the University of Queensland, where she majored in psychology and drama. She later undertook her drama training at Queensland University of Technology, graduating with a Bachelor of Fine Arts in Acting in 2003.

Career
Pickering portrayed Elly Tate on the drama headLand in 2005. She also played the recurring role of Detective Christine Taylor in the BBC-commissioned soap opera Out of the Blue. In the soap opera Home and Away she appeared as Natalie Franklin, the mother of Nicole, portrayed by Tessa James.

Pickering starred in the 2010 Australian drama-thriller film The Reef. From 2010, Pickering played the role of Melissa "Missy" Partridge in the ABC drama Rake. In 2014, she appeared in Neighbours as Erin Rogers.

Filmography

Film

Television

Theatre

References

External links

1981 births
Australian film actresses
Australian stage actresses
Australian television actresses
Living people
People from Warwick, Queensland
Queensland University of Technology alumni
University of Queensland alumni
21st-century Australian actresses